Maroon-chinned fruit dove has been split into 3 species:
 Banggai fruit dove, 	Ptilinopus subgularis
 Oberholser's fruit dove, 	Ptilinopus epius
 Sula fruit dove, 	  Ptilinopus mangoliensis

Animal common name disambiguation pages